Ashfield may refer to:

People
 Ashfield (surname)

Places

Australia
 Ashfield, New South Wales, a suburb of Sydney
 Municipality of Ashfield, a former local government area in Sydney
 Electoral district of Ashfield, a former electoral district
 Ashfield, Queensland, a mixed residential and rural locality in the Bundaberg Region
 Ashfield, Western Australia, a suburb of Perth

Canada
 Ashfield, Ontario, in Ashfield–Colborne–Wawanosh

Republic of Ireland
 Ashfield, a townland of County Laois
 Ashfield, County Offaly, townland in the civil parish of Durrow, barony of Ballycowan

 Ashfeild east Kilkenny

United Kingdom

England
 Ashfield, Hampshire, a village
 Ashfield, Herefordshire, place in Herefordshire
 HM Prison Ashfield, a prison for young people near Bristol
 Ashfield District, Nottinghamshire
 Ashfield (UK Parliament constituency)
 Ashfield, Shropshire
 Ashfield, Suffolk, a village

Northern Ireland
 Ashfield, County Down, the location of Ashfield Halt railway station

Scotland
 Ashfield, Argyll and Bute
 Ashfield, Stirling, a village in the Stirling council area

Wales
 Ashfield, Carmarthenshire

United States
 Ashfield, Massachusetts, a town
 Ashfield, Pennsylvania, an unincorporated community

Schools
 Ashfield College, Dublin, Ireland
 Ashfield School (disambiguation)

Other uses
 Ashfield F.C., a football club from Glasgow
 Ashfield railway station (disambiguation)
 Ashfield baronets, an extinct title in the Baronetage of England

See also
 Ashfields, a village in Shropshire, England